Richard Osei Agyemang (born 6 April 1995) is a Ghanaian professional footballer who plays as a defender for I-League club Real Kashmir.

Club career

Berekum Chelsea 
Agyemang played for Bono-based team Berekum Chelsea in the 2015 Ghanaian Premier League season helping them to place 4th. In the process he made 17 league appearances and won 4 man of the match awards.

Asante Kotoko 
In November 2015, he was signed by Kumasi-based club Asante Kotoko on a 3-year contract. After featuring in 18 league appearances in the 2016 Ghanaian Premier League, It was reported in the media in October 2016 that he had been placed on the transfer list of the club. He remained in the club for the following season only playing in 4 league matches for the 2017 Ghanaian Premier League season and being reportedly listed on the transfer list again at the end of the season.

Ashanti Gold 
In August 2018, Asante Kotoko announced the departure of  Agyemang and fellow player Isaac Quansah. With one season left on his contract, he signed a 3-year deal for Obuasi-based team Ashanti Gold. He was a member of the club's squad that featured in the 2020–21 CAF Confederation Cup. In August 2020, he signed a new 3-year contract with the club after the expiration of his initial 3-year contract.

International career 
Agyemang was part of the Black Meteors team, Ghana national under-23 football team that participated in the 2015 All-Africa Games in Brazzaville, Congo Brazzaville.

References

External links 

 
 

Living people
1995 births
Ghanaian footballers
Association football defenders
Ghana Premier League players
Asante Kotoko S.C. players
Ashanti Gold SC players